The arrondissement of Vesoul is an arrondissement of France in the Haute-Saône department in the Bourgogne-Franche-Comté region. It has 346 communes.

Composition

The communes of the arrondissement of Vesoul, and their INSEE codes, are:

 Aboncourt-Gesincourt (70002)
 Achey (70003)
 Aisey-et-Richecourt (70009)
 Amance (70012)
 Amoncourt (70015)
 Ancier (70018)
 Andelarre (70019)
 Andelarrot (70020)
 Angirey (70022)
 Apremont (70024)
 Arbecey (70025)
 Arc-lès-Gray (70026)
 Argillières (70027)
 Aroz (70028)
 Arsans (70030)
 Attricourt (70032)
 Augicourt (70035)
 Aulx-lès-Cromary (70036)
 Autet (70037)
 Authoison (70038)
 Autoreille (70039)
 Autrey-lès-Cerre (70040)
 Autrey-lès-Gray (70041)
 Auvet-et-la-Chapelotte (70043)
 Auxon (70044)
 Avrigney-Virey (70045)
 Baignes (70047)
 Bard-lès-Pesmes (70048)
 Barges (70049)
 La Barre (70050)
 Les Bâties (70053)
 Battrans (70054)
 Baulay (70056)
 Bay (70057)
 Beaujeu-Saint-Vallier-Pierrejux-et-Quitteur (70058)
 Beaumotte-Aubertans (70059)
 Beaumotte-lès-Pin (70060)
 Besnans (70065)
 Betaucourt (70066)
 Betoncourt-sur-Mance (70070)
 Blondefontaine (70074)
 Bonboillon (70075)
 Bonnevent-Velloreille (70076)
 Borey (70077)
 Bougey (70078)
 Bougnon (70079)
 Bouhans-et-Feurg (70080)
 Bouhans-lès-Montbozon (70082)
 Boulot (70084)
 Boult (70085)
 Bourbévelle (70086)
 Bourguignon-lès-Conflans (70087)
 Bourguignon-lès-la-Charité (70088)
 Bourguignon-lès-Morey (70089)
 Boursières (70090)
 Bousseraucourt (70091)
 Bresilley (70092)
 Breurey-lès-Faverney (70095)
 Brotte-lès-Ray (70099)
 Broye-Aubigney-Montseugny (70101)
 Broye-les-Loups-et-Verfontaine (70100)
 Brussey (70102)
 Bucey-lès-Gy (70104)
 Bucey-lès-Traves (70105)
 Buffignécourt (70106)
 Bussières (70107)
 Buthiers (70109)
 Calmoutier (70111)
 Cemboing (70112)
 Cenans (70113)
 Cendrecourt (70114)
 Cerre-lès-Noroy (70115)
 Chambornay-lès-Bellevaux (70118)
 Chambornay-lès-Pin (70119)
 Champlitte (70122)
 Champtonnay (70124)
 Champvans (70125)
 Chancey (70126)
 Chantes (70127)
 La Chapelle-Saint-Quillain (70129)
 Charcenne (70130)
 Chargey-lès-Gray (70132)
 Chargey-lès-Port (70133)
 Chariez (70134)
 Charmes-Saint-Valbert (70135)
 Charmoille (70136)
 Chassey-lès-Montbozon (70137)
 Chassey-lès-Scey (70138)
 Chaumercenne (70142)
 Chauvirey-le-Châtel (70143)
 Chauvirey-le-Vieil (70144)
 Chaux-la-Lotière (70145)
 Chaux-lès-Port (70146)
 Chemilly (70148)
 Chenevrey-et-Morogne (70150)
 Chevigney (70151)
 Choye (70152)
 Cintrey (70153)
 Cirey (70154)
 Citey (70156)
 Clans (70158)
 Cognières (70159)
 Colombe-lès-Vesoul (70162)
 Colombier (70163)
 Colombotte (70164)
 Combeaufontaine (70165)
 Comberjon (70166)
 Conflandey (70167)
 Confracourt (70169)
 Contréglise (70170)
 Cordonnet (70174)
 Cornot (70175)
 Corre (70177)
 Coulevon (70179)
 Courcuire (70181)
 Courtesoult-et-Gatey (70183)
 Cresancey (70185)
 Cromary (70189)
 Cubry-lès-Faverney (70190)
 Cugney (70192)
 Cult (70193)
 Dampierre-sur-Linotte (70197)
 Dampierre-sur-Salon (70198)
 Dampvalley-lès-Colombe (70199)
 Delain (70201)
 La Demie (70203)
 Denèvre (70204)
 Échenoz-la-Méline (70207)
 Échenoz-le-Sec (70208)
 Écuelle (70211)
 Équevilley (70214)
 Esmoulins (70218)
 Essertenne-et-Cecey (70220)
 Étrelles-et-la-Montbleuse (70222)
 Étuz (70224)
 Fahy-lès-Autrey (70225)
 Faverney (70228)
 Fédry (70230)
 Ferrières-lès-Ray (70231)
 Ferrières-lès-Scey (70232)
 Filain (70234)
 Flagy (70235)
 Fleurey-lès-Faverney (70236)
 Fleurey-lès-Lavoncourt (70237)
 Fondremand (70239)
 Fontenois-lès-Montbozon (70243)
 Fouchécourt (70244)
 Fouvent-Saint-Andoche (70247)
 Framont (70252)
 Francourt (70251)
 Frasne-le-Château (70253)
 Fresne-Saint-Mamès (70255)
 Fretigney-et-Velloreille (70257)
 Frotey-lès-Vesoul (70261)
 Germigney (70265)
 Gevigney-et-Mercey (70267)
 Gézier-et-Fontenelay (70268)
 Gourgeon (70272)
 Grandecourt (70274)
 La Grande-Résie (70443)
 Grandvelle-et-le-Perrenot (70275)
 Grattery (70278)
 Gray (70279)
 Gray-la-Ville (70280)
 Gy (70282)
 Hugier (70286)
 Hyet (70288)
 Igny (70289)
 Jonvelle (70291)
 Jussey (70292)
 Lambrey (70293)
 Larians-et-Munans (70296)
 Larret (70297)
 Lavigney (70298)
 Lavoncourt (70299)
 Lieffrans (70301)
 Lieucourt (70302)
 Liévans (70303)
 Lœuilley (70305)
 Loulans-Verchamp (70309)
 Le Magnoray (70316)
 Magny-lès-Jussey (70320)
 Mailley-et-Chazelot (70324)
 Maizières (70325)
 La Malachère (70326)
 Malans (70327)
 Malvillers (70329)
 Mantoche (70331)
 Marnay (70334)
 Maussans (70335)
 Melin (70337)
 Membrey (70340)
 Menoux (70341)
 Mercey-sur-Saône (70342)
 Mersuay (70343)
 Molay (70350)
 Mont-Saint-Léger (70369)
 Mont-le-Vernois (70367)
 Montagney (70353)
 Montarlot-lès-Rioz (70355)
 Montboillon (70356)
 Montbozon (70357)
 Montcey (70358)
 Montcourt (70359)
 Montigny-lès-Cherlieu (70362)
 Montigny-lès-Vesoul (70363)
 Montjustin-et-Velotte (70364)
 Montot (70368)
 Montureux-et-Prantigny (70371)
 Montureux-lès-Baulay (70372)
 Motey-Besuche (70374)
 Nantilly (70376)
 Navenne (70378)
 Neurey-en-Vaux (70380)
 Neurey-lès-la-Demie (70381)
 Neuvelle-lès-Cromary (70383)
 Neuvelle-lès-la-Charité (70384)
 La Neuvelle-lès-Scey (70386)
 Noidans-le-Ferroux (70387)
 Noidans-lès-Vesoul (70388)
 Noiron (70389)
 Noroy-le-Bourg (70390)
 Oigney (70392)
 Oiselay-et-Grachaux (70393)
 Onay (70394)
 Ormenans (70397)
 Ormoy (70399)
 Ouge (70400)
 Ovanches (70401)
 Oyrières (70402)
 Pennesières (70405)
 Percey-le-Grand (70406)
 Perrouse (70407)
 Pesmes (70408)
 Pierrecourt (70409)
 Pin (70410)
 Polaincourt-et-Clairefontaine (70415)
 Pontcey (70417)
 Port-sur-Saône (70421)
 Poyans (70422)
 Preigney (70423)
 Provenchère (70426)
 Purgerot (70427)
 Pusey (70428)
 Pusy-et-Épenoux (70429)
 La Quarte (70430)
 Quenoche (70431)
 Quincey (70433)
 Raincourt (70436)
 Ranzevelle (70437)
 Ray-sur-Saône (70438)
 Raze (70439)
 Recologne (70440)
 Recologne-lès-Rioz (70441)
 Renaucourt (70442)
 La Résie-Saint-Martin (70444)
 Rigny (70446)
 Rioz (70447)
 Roche-et-Raucourt (70448)
 La Rochelle (70450)
 La Roche-Morey (70373)
 Roche-sur-Linotte-et-Sorans-les-Cordiers (70449)
 La Romaine (70418)
 Rosey (70452)
 Rosières-sur-Mance (70454)
 Ruhans (70456)
 Rupt-sur-Saône (70457)
 Saint-Broing (70461)
 Saint-Gand (70463)
 Saint-Loup-Nantouard (70466)
 Saint-Marcel (70468)
 Saint-Rémy-en-Comté (70472)
 Sainte-Reine (70471)
 Saponcourt (70476)
 Sauvigney-lès-Gray (70479)
 Sauvigney-lès-Pesmes (70480)
 Savoyeux (70481)
 Scey-sur-Saône-et-Saint-Albin (70482)
 Scye (70483)
 Semmadon (70486)
 Senoncourt (70488)
 Seveux-Motey (70491)
 Soing-Cubry-Charentenay (70492)
 Sorans-lès-Breurey (70493)
 Sornay (70494)
 Tartécourt (70496)
 Theuley (70499)
 Thieffrans (70500)
 Thiénans (70501)
 Tincey-et-Pontrebeau (70502)
 Traitiéfontaine (70503)
 Traves (70504)
 Le Tremblois (70505)
 Tromarey (70509)
 Trésilley (70507)
 Vadans (70510)
 Vaite (70511)
 Vaivre-et-Montoille (70513)
 Valay (70514)
 Vallerois-Lorioz (70517)
 Vallerois-le-Bois (70516)
 Le Val-Saint-Éloi (70518)
 Vandelans (70519)
 Vanne (70520)
 Vantoux-et-Longevelle (70521)
 Varogne (70522)
 Vars (70523)
 Vauchoux (70524)
 Vauconcourt-Nervezain (70525)
 Vaux-le-Moncelot (70527)
 Velesmes-Échevanne (70528)
 Velet (70529)
 Velle-le-Châtel (70536)
 Velleclaire (70531)
 Vellefaux (70532)
 Vellefrey-et-Vellefrange (70533)
 Vellefrie (70534)
 Velleguindry-et-Levrecey (70535)
 Vellemoz (70538)
 Vellexon-Queutrey-et-Vaudey (70539)
 Velloreille-lès-Choye (70540)
 Venisey (70545)
 Venère (70542)
 Vereux (70546)
 Vernois-sur-Mance (70548)
 La Vernotte (70549)
 Vesoul (70550)
 Villars-le-Pautel (70554)
 Villefrancon (70557)
 La Villeneuve-Bellenoye-et-la-Maize (70558)
 Villeparois (70559)
 Villers-Bouton (70560)
 Villers-Chemin-et-Mont-lès-Étrelles (70366)
 Villers-Pater (70565)
 Villers-Vaudey (70568)
 Villers-le-Sec (70563)
 Villers-sur-Port (70566)
 Vilory (70569)
 Vitrey-sur-Mance (70572)
 Volon (70574)
 Voray-sur-l'Ognon (70575)
 Vougécourt (70576)
 Vregille (70578)
 Vy-le-Ferroux (70580)
 Vy-lès-Filain (70583)
 Vy-lès-Rupt (70582)

History

The arrondissement of Vesoul was created in 1800. In January 2017 it gained three communes from the arrondissement of Lure, and it lost five communes to the arrondissement of Lure.

As a result of the reorganisation of the cantons of France which came into effect in 2015, the borders of the cantons are no longer related to the borders of the arrondissements. The cantons of the arrondissement of Vesoul were, as of January 2015:

 Amance
 Autrey-lès-Gray
 Champlitte
 Combeaufontaine
 Dampierre-sur-Salon
 Fresne-Saint-Mamès
 Gray
 Gy
 Jussey
 Marnay
 Montbozon
 Noroy-le-Bourg
 Pesmes
 Port-sur-Saône
 Rioz
 Scey-sur-Saône-et-Saint-Albin
 Vesoul-Est
 Vesoul-Ouest
 Vitrey-sur-Mance

References

Vesoul
Vesoul